Sierra de La Ventana may refer to:

 Sierra de La Ventana (town)
 Sierra de la Ventana (mountains)